Marco Antônio Garcia Alves (born 26 December 1940), better known as just Marco Antônio, is a Brazilian footballer. He played in seven matches for the Brazil national football team in 1963. He was also part of Brazil's squad for the 1963 South American Championship.

References

External links
 
 

1940 births
Living people
Brazilian footballers
Brazil international footballers
Association football midfielders
Sportspeople from Rio de Janeiro (state)
America Football Club (RJ) players
América Futebol Clube (MG) players
São Paulo FC players
Cruzeiro Esporte Clube players
Uberlândia Esporte Clube players
Botafogo Futebol Clube (SP) players
Goiânia Esporte Clube players